The Velvet Lounge was a nightclub in the South Loop of Chicago. It started as a jazz club and was called the "dusty epicenter of the Midwest's free form jazz scene." It was located at 2128 1/2 S. Indiana Avenue before moving to 67 E. Cermak when the original building was scheduled for demolition. It closed permanently in 2019.

History 
The club was established in 1983 by jazz saxophonist Fred Anderson who owned the business until his death in 2010. Many live albums were recorded at the club, including a series of performances featuring Anderson himself, on the Delmark label, and 1998's Live at the Velvet Lounge with Anderson, Peter Kowald, and Hamid Drake. Many prominent musicians played the Velvet Lounge early in their careers, particularly in Sunday night jam sessions. The club's standard lineup of the early 1990s featured trumpeter , saxophonist Art Taylor, pianist , bassist , and drummer . From the mid 1990s, the "Velvet Graduates" house band included tenor saxophonist , baritone saxophonist , alto saxophonist  II, bassist Karl E. H. Seigfried, and drummer . After Anderson's death, the club was purchased by a neighboring business which ended the jazz performances and instead presented DJs, hip hop music, and comedians.

In 2013, Mike Reed founded the Constellation club, in part to fill the void left after the Velvet Lounge closed.

References

See also
List of jazz clubs

Nightclubs in Chicago
Jazz clubs in Chicago